Capital punishment was abolished in Togo in 2009. Togo last executed in 1978. Prior to the death penalty's de jure abolition, Togo was classified as "Abolitionist in Practice."

Togo acceded to the Second Optional Protocol to the International Covenant on Civil and Political Rights on 14 Sep 2016. Togo voted in favor of the 2020 United Nations moratorium on the death penalty resolution.

References 

Togo
Law of Togo